Seven Sport is the brand and production department under which all sporting events on the Seven Network are broadcast. It broadcasts some of Australia's most prominent sporting events, such as the AFL, cricket, the Olympics and Paralympics, as well as horse racing and motor racing.

In late September 2019, it was announced that Head of Sport Saul Shtein (who had been in the position since 2004) would be leaving the company after the AFL Grand Final, reportedly as a result of widespread company cost cutting and restructuring. He was replaced by long-time Seven Melbourne managing director Lewis Martin.

History
The Seven Network is a major player in Australian sports broadcasting.

Australian rules football
From the first year of television in Australia in 1956 to 2001, Seven was the main broadcaster of the VFL/AFL. From the early 1970s to 1986 Seven was along with the ABC the main broadcaster of the VFL showing replays and highlights of matches played that Saturday. In 1977 Seven paid the VFL $500,000 to broadcast the Grand Final and a further $500,000 to broadcast the Grand Final Replay also live with the drawn match watch by 1.2 Million viewers at the time the biggest daytime audience in Australia television history. In 1987, after taken over by new ownership from Sydney, HSV-7 lost the VFL rights to Broadcom who on sold the rights in Victoria to the ABC (Broadcom also sold the rights to TVW-7 in Perth) after offering less money compared to the previous year, the rights were regained the next year.

In 2001 the Seven Network announced that after 45 years as the official broadcaster of the VFL/AFL that it would finished its partnership at the end of the season. Nine and Ten entered a joint rights deal with pay TV provider Foxtel to ensure that all eight matches of each round were televised, starting in 2002 and concluding in 2006. At the time and being the only broadcaster, Seven broadcast only one match at a timeslot at a time and showed highlights of other matches that were not broadcast.

On 5 January 2006, Seven regained the rights to the AFL in the following broadcast deal, covering the period between 2007 and 2011 inclusive, in a joint contract with Ten and Foxtel. The cost of the deal was A$780 million, an A$280 million increase on the Nine/Ten/Foxtel 2002-2006 joint broadcast venture. Under the deal, Seven and Ten alternated the Brownlow Medal ceremonies and the AFL Grand Final; Seven televised the Friday night and Sunday afternoon Premiership season matches, while Ten televised the two Saturday matches and Foxtel televising the rest. Both Seven and Ten alternate in show the NAB Cup Grand Final, the Brownlow Medal count (2007, 2009 and 2011 were shown on Seven) and the AFL Grand Final (2008 and both in 2010).

In 2011, it was announced that Seven and Foxtel would share the football broadcast rights from 2012 to 2016, bringing Ten's 10-year run to an end. Under the new deal, Seven would televise four games per week, and Foxtel would simulcast coverage of Seven's games and broadcast the other five weekly games live and exclusive. Seven televised the entire finals series, with Foxtel simulcasting all finals except for the Grand Final, which was televised live and exclusively by Seven. The deal required Seven to televise all but the Saturday afternoon match live into Victoria and Tasmania; all four games were shown live into the northern states on 7mate and games were shown live or on delay into Western Australia (night matches on 7mate, day matches on Seven) and South Australia (all on Seven) depending on Seven's television schedule.

In 2015, Seven commenced broadcasting the WAFL and VFL showing one match a week and all finals from both competitions that did not clash with AFL games in each market, this followed the previous year where SANFL were being broadcast on under the same agreement. For both the WAFL and SANFL, it was the first time since 1987 that each league were broadcast on Seven with all three being on Seven after long association with the ABC ending the previous year.

Also announced in 2015 that Seven would again be the sole free-to-air broadcaster of AFL matches, for the period between 2017 and 2022. Under the deal, Seven no longer televises the Saturday afternoon match into Victoria, however, matches in this timeslot involving interstate teams continue to be televised into their respective markets. Controversially, however, up to three matches involving each of all four of the Western Australia and South Australia clubs (the West Coast Eagles,  and ) are televised on a significant delay, with the telecast starting after the final siren has gone in real time.

Under a revised deal (post COVID-19) agreement, Channel Seven will show up to five matches per week live on their networks, with Fox Sports broadcasting each and every game on either a Fox Footy or Fox Sports 503. Two matches of both the Eagles and Dockers in WA and one match of both the Crows and Power in SA was shown on a significant delay in the shortened 2020 season. On June 11 the AFL and the Seven Network extended its current agreement until 2022 for an extra two until the end of 2024 with the deal virtually the same as the original one signed prior to 2017.

Olympics
The network's coverage of the 2000 Sydney Olympics attracted a TV audience of over 6.5 million Australians for the opening and closing ceremonies. The broadcast also ran on the short-lived C7 Sport subscription channel.

During its time as the broadcaster of the Olympic Games, it has won the Olympic Golden Rings for the Best Television coverage for the best television programme during the 2004 Olympic Games in Athens.

During the 2006 Winter Olympics in Turin, Seven and NBC Universal were the major recipients of the Golden Rings; with Seven taking the Golden Rings for the best Olympic Programme, the Silver Rings for the best Olympic feature (NBC Universal received the Golden Rings), and the Bronze Rings for the Best Sports Coverage (behind SRG Switzerland and YLE Finland).

During Seven's coverage of the XXIX Olympiad, numerous complaints by the general Australian public were made to the Seven Network for several reasons, including the lack of a broadcast of events to which Australia is not competing in, too many advertisements and at inappropriate times during events and poor commentating of events. There has also been media speculation about the editing of Olympic events by Seven; how live sound from events is faded and the commentary sound is the prominent sound feature.

Seven had exclusive Australian free-to-air, pay television, online and mobile telephony broadcast rights to the 2008 Summer Olympics in Beijing. The live telecast of the XXIX Olympiad was shared by both the Seven Network and SBS Television. Seven broadcast the opening and closing ceremonies and mainstream sports including swimming, athletics, rowing, cycling and gymnastics. In stark contrast, SBS TV provided complementary coverage focused on long-form events such as soccer, road cycling, volleyball, and table tennis.

Seven's coverage of the 2008 Summer Olympics was widely criticised by viewers, with many angry at the networks contractual obligation to show AFL football over the Olympics. Viewers also complained that many team sports were delayed, with the absence of Roy and HG and with seemingly large amounts of advertising breaks during live events upsetting some viewers. Despite this, the International Olympic Committee awarded Seven the 'Golden Rings' award for "Best Olympic Programme". The award is given for the best overall Olympic coverage.

From 2016, Seven once again became the home of the Summer Olympic Games, Winter Olympic Games and the Summer Paralympic Games. In October 2020, the Seven Network announced it would be the home of the 2022 Winter Olympics in Beijing

Commonwealth Games
Seven screened the 2002 Commonwealth Games from Manchester and were the official broadcaster of the 2018 Commonwealth Games on home soil on the Gold Coast in April 2018. In July 2022, Seven also broadcast the 2022 Commonwealth Games in Birmingham.

Motor racing
From 1963 to 1997, Seven was the home of motor sport in Australia as they broadcast the Australian Touring Car Championship (ATCC) and the Bathurst 1000. Seven were the first broadcasters to use race cam in the 1979 Bathurst 1000, which allowed them to talk to the drivers mid-race.

The Seven commentary team included Evan Green, Will Hagon and Geoff Stone (late 60s to the mid 70s). It included Mike Raymond from 1977 to 1995 and Garry Wilkinson from 1978 to 1996 (V8 1000). Neil Crompton reporting from the pits from around 1985, Mark Oastler (1989–1996), Doug Mulray (1988–1994), Allan Moffat (1985–1996, V8 1000) and as a pit reporter Andy Raymond (early 90s). At the Bathurst 1000, Sandy Roberts or Bruce McAvaney would be the host during the early to mid 1990s.

In 1997, Seven lost the rights to the ATCC to Network Ten, but still broadcast the Australian Super Touring Championship until the series' demise in 2001. In 2003, Seven Sport broadcast the Nations Cup and V8 Utes, before Network Ten broadcast the V8 Utes in 2005 after the collapse of organising body Procar Australia.

From 2007 to 2014, Seven regained the rights to V8 Supercars. The commentary team included Neil Crompton, Mark Skaife and Mark Larkham. From 2015, Seven Sport broadcasts the Bathurst 12 Hour endurance race.

In 2020, Seven regained the TV rights to the Supercars Championship, sharing the rights with Foxtel in a deal worth $200 million for 5 years (2021-2025). The new deal has Seven Sport show seven rounds of the Supercars Championship live and showing highlights of the rounds it is not able to televise.

Cricket
On 13 April 2018, Cricket Australia announced that the Seven Network had acquired free-to-air media rights to a package of events beginning in the 2018–19 season, under a six-year contract as part of a consortium with Foxtel. Seven would broadcast coverage of all test matches, Women's internationals, 43 Big Bash League matches per-season, and 23 Women's Big Bash League matches per-season. All events would be shared with the newly established Fox Cricket channel. This ended Nine's 45-year run as television rightsholder of international cricket in Australia.

In September 2020, it was reported that Seven was attempting to exit its contract, citing an alleged breach of contract surrounding the scheduling of the 2020–21 season, and that the COVID-19 pandemic in Australia would diminish the quality of the 2020–21 Big Bash League season (violating a contractual obligation for the quality of events carried by Seven to meet that of the previous season). In November 2020, Seven lodged an affidavit in the Federal Court of Australia in Melbourne, seeking access to communications with the Board of Control for Cricket in India (BCCI) in regards to scheduling changes for India's 2020–21 tour of Australia. Seven took issue with the ODIs being moved to the start of the series rather than the test matches (which will be the final event of the series) as they would be exclusive to Fox Cricket, and the final test would overlap the end of the holiday season, reducing potential viewership. Seven West Media CEO James Warburton argued that "there aren't many sports that would launch their season behind a paywall", and that the broadcaster wanted to be "fairly compensated for the value reduction caused by the changes to the schedule and other changes."

Rugby League
In 2016, the Seven Network won the broadcasting rights deal to be the main broadcaster of the 2017 Rugby League World Cup in Australia, beating the other regular rugby league broadcasting channels of Fox League and the Nine Network to secure the deal.

Theme
Seven Sport has used "Fanfare for the Common Man" by Emerson, Lake & Palmer as its theme since 1989. During the 1980s and early 1990s, Seven used the music piece for Sporting events such as: AFL, Australian Open and Australian Touring Car Championship. Up until 2011, an abridged version of the opening fanfare was used. The music piece returned for introductions of the networks sporting coverage since 2018 AFL Grand Final with a version of the Fanfare for the Common Man being used for all sporting coverage including AFL, Cricket and Horse Racing.

Events
Seven Sport holds broadcast rights to the following events:

Current

Past

Programs
Seven Sport has presented the following recurring programmes:

Current

Past

Staff and commentators

The following network personalities are seen across multiple Seven Sport events:

 Bruce McAvaney (chief commentator, all sports; member since 1989)
 Johanna Griggs (host, Olympics, Commonwealth Games and Australian Open; member since 1994)
 Hamish McLachlan (host, Olympics, Commonwealth Games, Australian Open; presenter AFL, Melbourne Cup, cricket; member since 2008)
 Jason Richardson (host, cricket and Australian Open; presenter Olympics, Commonwealth Games and Melbourne Cup; member since 2014)
 Mel McLaughlin (host, Olympics, cricket and Australian Open; presenter Commonwealth Games, Melbourne Cup; member since 2016)
 Abbey Gelmi (host, Olympics, Cricket, AFL, Horse Racing, Motor Racing; member since 2018)
 James Brayshaw (commentator, AFL, Cricket; member since 2018)

Olympic Games

Tokyo 2020

Bruce McAvaney (Athletics/Ceremonies Commentator)
Hamish McLachlan (Prime Time Co-Host)
Abbey Gelmi (Prime Time Co-Host)
Matt Shirvington (Afternoons Co-Host)
Edwina Bartholomew (Afternoons Co-Host)
Luke Darcy (Mornings Co-Host)
Johanna Griggs (Mornings Co-Host)
Andy Maher (Late Nights Co-Host)
Lisa Sthalekar (Late Nights Co-Host)
Mel McLaughlin (Tokyo Reporter)
Annabelle Williams (Paralympics Co-Host)
Kurt Fearnley (Paralympics Co-Host)
Mark Beretta (Tokyo Reporter)
Jason Richardson (Athletics Trackside)
Nathan Templeton (Swimming Poolside)
Tamsyn Lewis (Athletics Commentary)
Dave Culbert (Athletics Commentary)
Basil Zempilas (Swimming Commentary)
Giaan Rooney (Swimming Commentary)
Ian Thorpe (Swimming Commentary)
Candice Warner (Marathon Swimming/Triathlon Commentary)
Andrew Gaze (Basketball Commentary)
John Casey (Men's Basketball Commentary)
Rachael Sporn (Women's Basketball Commentary)
 Alister Nicholson (Hockey Commentary)
Georgie Parker (Hockey Commentary)
Scott McGrory (Cycling Commentary)
Anna Meares (Cycling Commentary)
Nick Green (Rowing/Canoeing Commentary)
Kerri Pottharst (Beach Volleyball Commentary)
Matt Hill (Rowing, Canoeing, Kayaking Commentary)
Russell Mark (Shooting Commentary)
Debbie Watson (Water Polo Commentary)
Greg Clark (Rugby Sevens Commentary)
Brenton Speed (Football, Beach Volleyball, Tennis, Basketball Commentary)
Chris Stubbs (7Mate Host)
Trent Copeland (7Mate Host)
Emma Freedman (7Mate Host)

Rio 2016
Most Seven programs, except Sunrise and The Chase Australia, went on hiatus during Seven's broadcast of the Olympic Games.

Bruce McAvaney (Host/Main Commentator)
Hamish McLachlan (Host)
Mel McLaughlin (Host)
Bill McDonald (Mixed Zone Reporter, News Host & Table Tennis Commentator)
Jim Wilson (Host)
Kylie Gillies (Host)
Todd Woodbridge (Host)
David Koch  (Olympic Sunrise Host)
Natalie Barr (Olympic Sunrise Host)
Johanna Griggs (Host/Reporter/Ceremonies Commentator)
Rachael Finch (Reporter)
Edwina Bartholomew (Olympic Sunrise Reporter)
Mark Braybrook (Commentator)
Neil Kearney (Reporter)
Ryan Phelan (Olympic Update Host)
Amanda Abate (Olympic Update Host)
Steve Hooker (Athletics Commentator)
Tamsyn Lewis (Athletics Commentator)
Dave Culbert (Athletics/Canoeing/Kayaking Commentator)
Pat Welsh (Trackside Athletics Commentator)
Basil Zempilas (Swimming Commentator)
Giaan Rooney (Swimming Commentator)
Nathan Templeton (Poolside Swimming Commentator)
Phil Liggett (Cycling Commentator)
Scott McGrory (Cycling Commentator)
Kate Bates (Cycling Commentator)
Drew Ginn (Rowing/Canoeing/Kayaking Commentator)
Brenton Speed (Rowing Commentator)
 John Casey (Basketball Commentator)
Andrew Gaze (Basketball Commentator)
Lauren Jackson (Basketball Commentator)
Michael McCann (Diving Commentator)
Loudy Wiggins (Diving Commentator)
David Christison (Hockey Commentator)
Rechelle Hawkes (Hockey Commentator)
Vicki Roycroft (Equestrian Commentator)
Martin Gostelow (Equestrian Commentator)
Geoff Masters (Tennis Commentator)
Debbie Watson (Water Polo Commentator)
Bill Woods (Water Polo Commentator)
Mark Readings (7TWO & 7mate Host/Commentator)
Jason Richardson (7TWO & 7mate Host)
Aaron Noonan (7TWO & 7mate Host)
Michael Zappone (7TWO & 7mate Host/Football Commentator)

Beijing 2008

Bruce McAvaney (Ceremonies/Athletics/Swimming))
Andrew Daddo (Host)
Kylie Gillies (Host)
Johanna Griggs (Host)
Sandy Roberts (Host/Ceremonies)
Mathew White (Host)
Ric Birch (Ceremonies)
Sonia Kruger (Ceremonies)
Rebecca Wilson (Ceremonies)
Eddie Butler (Archery)
Raelene Boyle (Athletics)
Dave Culburt (Athletics/Beach Volleyball)
Steve Moneghetti (Athletics)
Steve Ovett (Athletics)
Pat Welsh (Athletics)
Peter Blackburn (Badminton)
Kerryn Pratt (Badminton/Softball/Tennis)
Chris Dittmar (Basketball)
Andrew Gaze (Basketball)
Rachael Sporn (Basketball)
Basil Zempilas (Basketball/Canoe-Kayak/Rowing)
Kerri Pottharst (Beach Volleyball)
Julien Prosser (Beach Volleyball)
Jim Neilly (Boxing)
Richie Woodhall (Boxing)
Peter Colquehoun (Canoe-Kayak/Cycling/Handball)
Michael Felgate (Canoe-Kayak/Handball/Rowing)
Darryl McCormack (Handball)
Tom Williams (Canoe-Kayak)
Neil Kearney (Cycling)
Phil Liggett (Cycling)
Mike Turtur (Cycling)
Peter Donegan (Diving/Table Tennis/Tennis)
Dean Pullar (Diving)
Simon Marshall (Equestrian)
Garry Wilkinson (Equestrian/Tennis)
Gordon Bray (Football/Hockey/Shooting/Taekwondo)
Mike McCann (Football)
Liz Chetkovich (Gymnastics)
Simon Reeve (Gymnastics)
David Wansbrough (Hockey)
Nicola Fairbrother (Judo)
Nick Mullins (Judo)
Nick Green (Rowing)
Nick McCallum (Sailing)
Shirley Robertson (Sailing)
Richard Simmons (Sailing)
Joyce Lester (Softball)
Duncan Armstrong (Swimming)
Daniel Kowalski (Swimming)
Kerri Tepper (Table Tennis)
Lauren Burns (Taekwondo)
Greg Welsh (Triathlon)
Jonathon Fogarty (Volleyball)
Jon Harker (Water Polo)
Debbie Watson (Water Polo)

Paralympic Games

Rio 2016

Matt Carmichael (Early Mornings Host)
Johanna Griggs (Mornings Host)
Mel McLaughlin (In Rio Today- Primetime Host)
Lawrence Mooney (In Rio Today- Primetime Host)
Annabelle Williams (In Rio Today- Primetime Host)
Tom Williams (Late Nights Host)
Steve Robilliard (Ceremonies Commentator)
Dave Culburt (Commentator)
Brenton Speed (Commentator)
Darren Boyd (Commentator)
Matt Hill (Commentator)
Mathew Cowdrey (Swimming)
Heath Francis (Athletics)
Will Dowling (Athletics)
Amy Bainbridge (Cycling/Swimming)
Duane Dell'Oca (Swimming)
Heather Fell (Swimming)
Neil Adams (Judo)
Michaela Breeze (Powerlifting)
Richard Drew (Table Tennis)
Peter Odgers (Table Tennis/Wheelchair Tennis)
Brent Pope (Wheelchair Basketball/Wheelchair Rugby)
Tom Kirkland (Wheelchair Basketball)
Dan Strange (Highlights Host/Wheelchair Basketball)
Gerald de Kock (Weelchair Tennis/Ceremonies)
Dylan Alcott (Reporter)
Emily Angwin (Reporter)
Emma Vosti (Reporter)

Commonwealth Games

Gold Coast 2018

Bruce McAvaney (Athletics/Ceremonies Commentator)
Hamish McLachlan (Host)
Johanna Griggs (Host)
Mel McLaughlin (Host)
Jim Wilson (Host)
Todd Woodbridge (Host)
Michael Felgate (7two Host)
Mark Gibson (7two Host)
Michael Zappone (7two Host)
Basil Zempilas (Swimming Commentator)
Dave Culbert (Athletics Commentator)
Ian Thorpe (Swimming)
Lord Sebastian Coe (Athletics)
Steve Hooker (Athletics)
Giaan Rooney (Swimming)
Scott McGrory (Cycling)
Kate Bates (Cycling)
Aaron Royle (Triathlon)
Tamsyn Lewis (Athletics)
Edwina Bartholomew (The Star Host)
Jason Richardson (The Star Host)
Pat Welsh (Athletics Trackside/Countdown to the Games Host)
Sharyn Ghidella (Countdown to the Games Host)
Nathan Templeton (Swimming Poolside)
Sam Lane (Cycling Trackside)
Amanda Abate (Sports Update Reader)
Rachael Finch (Reporter)
Tom Williams (Reporter)
Annabelle Williams (Reporter)
Matthew Mitcham (Reporter)
Emma Vosti (Reporter)
Bill McDonald (Reporter)
Curtis McGrath (Reporter)
Andy Maher (Front Bar)
Sam Pang (Front Bar)
Mick Molloy (Front Bar)

Australian Rules Football
As Seven is forced to show viewers in Western Australia, South Australia, New South Wales and Queensland games featuring their respective teams live, sometimes it will show a different game at the same time into these markets then into the rest of Australia. On these occasions, it will pick up Fox Footy's coverage of the match.

AFL
Current

 Hamish McLachlan (2012–present) (Host/Caller)
 James Brayshaw (2018–present) (Host/Caller)
 Brian Taylor (2012–present) (Host/Caller)
 Luke Darcy (2012–present) (Host/Caller) 
 Jason Bennett (2016–2019, 2021–present) (Caller)
 Alister Nicholson (2022–present) (Caller)
 Matt Hill (2022–present) (Caller)
 Abbey Gelmi (2020–present) (Host/Footy Central Updates)
 Luke Hodge (2020–present) (Expert Commentator/Field Commentator QLD Games)
 Daisy Pearce (2016–present) (Expert Commentator)
 Matthew Richardson (2010–present) (Expert Commentator/Field Commentator)
 Abbey Holmes (2018–present) (Field Commentator)
 Cameron Ling (2012–present) (Expert Commentator)
 Jimmy Bartel (2017–present) (Expert Commentator/Field Commentator)
 Jobe Watson (2019–present) (Expert Commentator)
 Tim Watson (1992, 1996–1998, 2001, 2007–present) (Expert Commentator)
 Leigh Matthews (1996–1998, 2009–2019, 2021–present) (Expert Commentator)
 Chris Johnson (2021–present) (Expert Commentator)
 Campbell Brown (2018–present) (Field Commentator)
 Shaun Burgoyne (2022–present) (Expert Commentator)
 Nathan Jones (2022–present) (Expert Commentator)
 Jude Bolton (2014–present) (Field Commentator NSW/ACT Games)
 Xavier Ellis (2019–present) (Field Commentator WA Games)
 Mark Soderstrom (2017–present) (Field Commentator SA Games/Fill-in Caller)
 Nigel Carmody (2018–2019, 2021–present) (Fill-in Caller)
 Tom Browne (2018–present) (Chief Reporter)
 Ryan Daniels (2019–present) (Reporter)
 Mitch Cleary (2022–present) (Reporter)
 Basil Zempilas (2012–present) (Fill-in Caller/host)
 Cam Luke (2019–present) (‘Armchair Experts’ Host)
 Adam Cooney (2019–present) (‘Armchair Experts’ Panelist)
 Heath Shaw (2021–present) (‘Sunday Session’ Panelist)
 Dale Thomas (2021–present) (‘Sunday Session’ Panelist)
 Georgie Parker (2021–present) (‘Armchair Experts’ Panelist, ‘Sunday Session’ Host)
 Andy Maher (2016–present) (The Front Bar Host)
 Mick Molloy (2014–present) (The Front Bar Panelist)
 Sam Pang (2016–present) (The Front Bar Panelist)
 Andy Lee (2020–present) (The Front Bar Panelist)

Past

 Tony Charlton (1957–1960) (Caller)
 Mike Williamson (1960–1976) (Caller)
 Alan Gale (1962–1970) (Caller)
 Ted Whitten (1965–1970, 1992) (Expert Commentator/Caller)
 Jack Edwards (1964–1986) (Caller)
 Allan Nash (1964–1967) (Caller)
 Frank Adams (1968–1978) (Expert Commentator)
 Bob Skilton (1972–1973, 1978–1986) (Expert Commentator/Caller)
 Lou Richards (1974–1986) (Caller)
 Doug Wade (1976–1982) (Caller)
 Peter Landy (1977–1999) (Caller)
 Peter McKenna (1978–1999) (Caller)
 Sandy Roberts (1981–2001) (Caller)
 Stephen Phillips (1979–1985, 1992–1996) (Field Commentator/Reporter)
 Scot Palmer (1982–2001) (Reporter)
 Peter Donegan (1982–1986) (Field Commentator/Reporter)
 Dennis Cometti (1988–2001, 2007–2016) (Caller)
 Drew Morphett (1988–2000) (Caller)
 Ian Robertson (1988–2001) (Caller)
 Malcolm Blight (1988, 1995–1996, 2000) (Expert Commentator)
 Bernie Quinlan (1988–1994) (Expert Commentator)
 Dixie Marshall (1988–1990) (Field Commentator)
 John Rogers (1988–1994) (Field Commentator)
 Ross Glendinning (1989–1998) (Expert Commentator)
 Bruce McAvaney (1990–2001, 2007–2020) (Caller)
 Gerard Healy (1991–2001) (Expert Commentator)
 Max Stevens (1991–1993) (Field Commentator)
 Kevin Bartlett (1994–2001) (Caller/Expert Commentator)
 Terry Wheeler (1994–1999) (Caller/Expert Commentator)
 Neil Kerley (1994–2001) (Field Commentator)
 Robert Dipierdomenico (1994–2001) (Field Commentator)
 Mike Sheahan (1994–2001) (Reporter)
 Rex Hunt (1996–1999) (Caller)
 Jason Dunstall (1999–2001) (Expert Commentator)
 Graham Cornes (1995–2001) (Expert Commentator)
 Adrian Barich (1995–2001) (Field Commentator)
 Richard Osborne (1999–2001) (Field Commentator/Expert Commentator)
 Tony Shaw (2000–2001) (Expert Commentator)
 Anthony Hudson (1999–2001) (Caller/Field Commentator)
 Dermott Brereton (2000–2001) (Expert Commentator)
 Robert Walls (2001) (Expert Commentator)
 Matthew Campbell (1994–2001) (Caller/Field Commentator)
 Mick McGuane (1997–1999) (Expert Commentator)
 Craig Hutchison (2001) (Caller)
 Paul Salmon (2001) (Expert Commentator)
 Chris Dittmar (2001) (Caller)
 Dale Lewis (1999–2001) (Expert Commentator)
 Paul Roos (2000) (Expert Commentator)
 Tony Lockett (2000–2001) (Expert Commentator)
 Nathan Buckley (2008–2009) (Expert Commentator)
 Rick Olarenshaw (2007–2009) (Field Commentator)
 David Schwarz (2007–2011) (Expert Commentator)
 Peter Larkins (2012–2013) (Field Commentator)
 Brett Kirk (2012) (Field Commentator)
 Peter Bell (2016–2018) (Field Commentator)
 Nick Maxwell (2014–2015) (Field Commentator)
 Mark McVeigh (2013–2014) (Field Commentator)
 Samantha Lane (2013–2019) (Reporter)
 Mark Stevens (2013–2021) (Reporter)
 Michael Malthouse (2012) (Expert Commentator)
 Tom Harley (2010–2014) (Expert Commentator)
 Andrew Welsh (2014–2017) (Field Commentator)
 Brad Sewell (2015–2017) (Field Commentator)
 Sam McClure (2017–2019) (Reporter)
 Gilbert McAdam (2018–2020) (Field Commentator)
 Nat Edwards (2019) (Host)
 Michael Warner (2019) (Reporter)
 Justin Leppitsch (2021) (Expert Commentator)
 Jacqui Felgate (2019–2022) (Footy Central Updates/Reporter)
 Wayne Carey (2014–2022) (Expert Commentator)

AFL Women's
Seven broadcast the AFL Women's Exhibition Matches between 2015 and 2016 before becoming the inaugural FTA broadcaster of the AFLW in 2017.

Current

 Jason Bennett (2015–present) (Caller)
 Nigel Carmody (2017–present) (Caller)
 Jo Wotton (2020–present) (Caller)
 Mark Soderstrom (2017–present) (Caller/Field Commentator SA Games)
 Alister Nicholson (2022–present) (Caller)
 Daisy Pearce (2017–present) (Expert Commentator)
 Abbey Holmes (2016–present) (Expert Commentator)
 Bec Goddard (2019–present) (Expert Commentator)
 Georgie Parker (2019–present) (Expert Commentator)
 Chelsea Randall (2018–present) (Expert Commentator)
 Mel Hickey (2021–present) (Expert Commentator)
 Ellie Blackburn (2019–present) (Expert Commentator)
 Nat Edwards (2018–present) (Host/Field Commentator)
 Sam Lane (2015–present) (Field Commentator)
 Abbey Gelmi (2020–present) (Host)
 Emma Vosti (2020–present) (Field Commentator)
 Josie Fielding (2021–present) (Field Commentator QLD Games)
 Anna Hay (2022–present) (Field Commentator WA Games)
 Ryan Daniels (2020–present) (Field Commentator WA Games)
 Libby Birch  (2022–present) (Expert Commentator)
 Nathan Jones (Australian footballer) (2022–present) (Expert Commentator)
 Mark Readings (2019–2020) (Field Commentator WA Games)
 Shaun Burgoyne (2022–present) (Expert Commentator)

Past

 Basil Zempilas (2020) (Caller)
 Andy Maher (2017) (Host)
 Tegan Higginbotham (2017) (Host)
 Lawrence Mooney (2017) (Host)
 Lauren Arnell (2017–2018) (Expert Commentator)
 Katie Brennan (2017) (Expert Commentator)
 Alana Smith-Fagan (2017) (Field Commentator)
 Peta Searle (2017–2019) (Expert Commentator)
 Georgie Parker (2019–2020) (Expert Commentator)
 Emma Kearney (2019–2020) (Expert Commentator)
 Dani Shuey (2019–2020) (Field Commentator)
 Jacqui Felgate (2019–2022) (Host/Field Commentator)

EJ Whitten Legends Game

 Brian Taylor (2016–2019) (Caller)
 Luke Darcy (2016) (Caller)
 James Brayshaw (2017–2019) (Caller)
 Brendon Fevola (2016) (Expert Commentator)
 Anthony Lehmann (2016) (Field Commentator)
 Tim Watson (2018–2019) (Expert Commentator)
 Gilbert McAdam (2019) (Field Commentator)
 Robert DiPierdomenico (2018–2019) (Field Commentator)

International Rules Series

 Anthony Hudson (2000) (Caller)
 Drew Morphett (1999–2000) (Caller)
 Dennis Cometti (2008) (Host/Caller)
 Bruce McAvaney (2008) (Host/Caller)
 Basil Zempilas (2008, 2014, 2017) (Host/Caller)
 Mark Soderstrom (2017) (Caller) 
 Mark Readings (2017) (Caller)
 Leigh Matthews (2000) (Expert Commentator)
 Robert DiPierdomenico (1999–2000) (Field Commentator)
 Tim Watson (2008) (Expert Commentator)
 David Schwartz (2008) (Expert Commentator)
 Rick Olarenshaw (2008) (Field Commentator)
 Cameron Ling (2014) (Expert Commentator)
 Setanta Ó hAilpín (2014) (Expert Commentator)
 Tadhg Kennelly (2008, 2017) (Expert Commentator)
 Mark Bickley (2017) (Expert Commentator)
 Peter Bell (2017) (Expert Commentator)

Victorian Football League
Current

 Jason Bennett (2015–present) (Host/Caller)
 Nigel Carmody (2015–present) (Caller)
 Campbell Brown (2015–present) Expert Commentator)
 Libby Birch (2022–present) (Field Commentator)

Past

 Alicia Eva (2017) (Field Commentator)
 Tristan Foenander (2017) (Field Commentator)
 Lauren Arnell (2016–2019)(Field Commentator/Expert Commentator)
 Nathan Templeton (2017–2019) (Field Commentator)
 Michael Barlow(2019–2021) (Expert Commentator)
 Abbey Gelmi (2021) (Host)
 Abbey Holmes (2016–2018, 2021) (Field Commentator/Analysis)
 Georgie Parker (2019, 2021) (Analysis)
 Adam Cooney (2021) (Analysis)
 Heath Shaw (2021) (Analysis)

WAFL
Current

 Mark Readings (2015–present) (Host/Caller) 
 Glenn Mitchell (2016–present) (Caller)
 Karl Langdon (2015, 2018, 2021–present) (Caller)
 Xavier Ellis (2018–present) (Expert Commentator)
 Lee Spurr (2019–present) (Expert Commentator/Field Commentator)
 Steve Butler (2016–present) (Field Commentator)

Past

 Dennis Cometti (1984–1987, 2017–2020) (Caller/Expert Commentator)
 Bob Miller (1970s–1986) (Caller)
 John Rogers (1976–1987) (Caller)
 Harvey Deegan (1977–1982) (Caller)
 Peter Ensell (1970s–1987) (Caller)
 Eric Sarich (1970s–1987) (Expert Commentator)
 Percy Johnson (1980s) (Caller/Expert Commentator)
 Frank Sparrow (1970s–1987) (Caller)
 Arthur Marshall (1970s–1986) (Caller/Expert Commentator)
 Nick Rynne (2015) (Field Commentator)
 Cassie Silver (2015) (Field Commentator)
 Peter Bell (2016–2018) (Expert Commentator)
 Paul Hasleby (2016–2018) (Expert Commentator)
 Andrew Embley (2015–2016) (Expert Commentator)

SANFL
Current

 Mark Soderstrom (2014–present) (Host/Caller)
 John Casey (2014–present) (Caller)
 Tim Ginever (2014–present) (Expert Commentator)
 Rhett Biglands (2016–present) (Expert Commentator/Field Commentator)
 Andrew Hayes (2018–present) (Field Commentator)

Past

 Rick Keegan (1980s) Host
 Bob Jervis (1980s) (Commentator)
 Blair Schwartz (1980s) (Commentator)
 Ian Day (1980s) (Commentator)
 Bruce McAvaney (1980s) (Commentator)
 Peter Marker (1980s) (Commentator)
 Alana Smith-Fagan (2016–2017) (Field Commentator)
 Tom Wilson (2015–2017) (Field Commentator)

Cricket

Australian Men's Test Cricket
Current

 Mel McLaughlin (Host) (2018/19–present)
 James Brayshaw (Host/Ball-by-Ball Caller) (2001, 2018/19–present)
 Alison Mitchell (Host/Ball-by-Ball Caller) (2018/19–present)
 Tim Lane (Ball-by-Ball Caller) (2018/19–present)
 Alister Nicholson (Ball-by-Ball Caller) (2018/19, 2021/22–present)
 Ricky Ponting (Expert Commentator) (2018/19–present)
 Damien Fleming (Expert Commentator) (2018/19–present)
 Greg Blewett (Host/Expert Commentator) (2018/19–present)
 Trent Copeland (Touch Screen Analyst) (2018/19–present)
 Simon Katich (Expert Commentator) (2018/19–present)
 Simon Taufel (Umpire Expert Commentator) (2020/21–present)
 Matthew Hayden (Expert Commentator) (2020/21–present)
 Holly Ferling (Expert Commentator) (2020/21–present)
 Peter Lalor (Lunch Panelist) (2018/19–present)
 Gideon Haigh (Lunch Panelist) (2018/19–present)
 Glenn McGrath (Expert Commentator) (2018/19–2019/20, 2021/22–present)
 Justin Langer (Expert Commentator) (2022/23–present)

International Expert Commentator

 Aakash Chopra (India/Border-Gavaskar Series) (2018/19)
 Marvan Atapattu (Sri Lanka/Warne-Muralitharan Series) (2019)
 Phil Tufnell (Sri Lanka/Warne-Muralitharan Series) (2019)
 Brendon McCullum (New Zealand/Trans-Tasman Trophy Series) (2019/20)
 Ramiz Raja (Pakistan Series) (2019)
 Sunil Gavaskar (India/Border-Gavaskar Series) (2020/21)
 Sir Ian Botham (England/Ashes Series) (2021/22)
 Michael Atherton (England/Ashes Series) (2021/22)
 Isabelle Westbury (England/Ashes Series Lunch Panelist) (2021/22)
 Dean Wilson (England/Ashes Series Lunch Panelist) (2021/22)

Past

 Bruce McAvaney (Presenter) (2018–2019)
 Hamish McLachlan (Presenter/Interviewer) (2018/19)
 Jason Gillespie (Expert Commentator) (2018-2019)
 Abbey Gelmi (Reporter)  (2018/19–2019/20)
 Emma Vosti (Reporter)  (2018/19–2019/20)
 Michael Slater (Expert Commentator) (2018/19–2020/21)
 Neil Kearney (Reporter)  (2018/19–2020/21)
 Andy Maher (Host/Ball-by-Ball Caller) (2021/22)
 Jason Richardson (Ball-by-Ball Caller) (2021/22)
 Brad Hodge (Expert Commentator) (2021/22)
 Callum Ferguson (Expert Commentator) (2021/22) 
 Lisa Sthalekar (Expert Commentator) (2021/22)
 Dirk Nannes (Expert Commentator) (2021/22)

Women's International Matches
Current

 Abbey Gelmi (Host) (2018/19–present)
 Erin Holland (Host) (2019/20–present)
 Alison Mitchell (International Ball-by-Ball Caller) (2021/22)
 Andy Maher (Host/Ball-by-Ball Caller) (2018/19–present)
 Jason Richardson (Host/Ball-by-Ball Caller) (2018/19–present)
 Lisa Sthalekar (Expert Commentator) (2018/19–present)
 Holly Ferling (Host/Expert Commentator) (2019/20–present)
 Elyse Villani (Expert Commentator) (2019/20–present)
 Brad Hodge (Expert Commentator) (2019–present)
 Kirby Short (Expert Commentator) (2020/21–present)
 Alister Nicholson (Ball-by-Ball Caller) (2018/19, 2021/22–present)
 Simon Taufel (Umpire Expert) (2021/22–present)
 Emma Inglis (Expert Commentator) (2021/22–present)
 Trent Copeland (Expert Commentator) (2021/22–present)
 Isabelle Westbury (Expert Commentator) (2021/22–present)

Past

 Mel McLaughlin (Host) (2018/19)
 Pat Cummins (Expert Commentator) (2018/19)
 Mitch Starc (Expert Commentator) (2018/19)
 Mark Readings (Ball-by-Ball Caller) (2018/19)
 Dirk Nannes (Expert Commentator) (2018/19)
 Jason Gillespie (Expert Commentator) (2018/19)
 Kristen Beams (Expert Commentator) (2019/20)
 Belinda Clark (Expert Commentator) (2020/21)
 Mel Jones (Expert Commentator) (2020/21)
 Damien Fleming (Expert Commentator) (2020/21)
 Jess Duffin (Expert Commentator) (2020/21)
 Julia Price (Expert Commentator) (2018/19–2020/21)

Big Bash League
Current

 Mel McLaughlin (Host) (2018/19–present)
 Abbey Gelmi (Host) (2018/19–present)
 Erin Holland (Host/Boundary Commentator) (2019/20–present)
 Andy Maher (Host/Ball-by-Ball Caller) (2018/19–present)
 Jason Richardson (Host/Ball-by-Ball Caller) (2018/19–present)
 James Brayshaw (Host/Ball-by-Ball Caller) (2018/19–present)
 Alister Nicholson (Host/Ball-by-Ball Caller) (2018/19–present)
 Ricky Ponting (Expert Commentator) (2018/19–present)
 Damien Fleming (Expert Commentator) (2018/19–present)
 Greg Blewett (Expert Commentator) (2018/19–present)
 Brad Hodge (Expert Commentator) (2018/19–present)
 Lisa Sthalekar (Expert Commentator) (2018/19–present)
 Trent Copeland (Expert Commentator) (2019/20—present)
 Callum Ferguson (Expert Commentator) (2021/22–present)
 Glenn Maxwell (Expert Commentator) (2020/21–present)
 Marcus Stoinis (Expert Commentator (2020/21–present)
 Aaron Finch (Expert Commentator (2021/22–present)
 Andre Russell (Expert Commentator (2021/22–present)
 Ashton Agar (Expert Commentator) (2021/22–present)
 Andrew Gaze (Guest Commentator) (2021/22–present)
 Sam Billings (Guest Commentator) (2021/22–present)
 Will Pucovski (Guest Commentator) (2021/22–present)
 Holly Ferling (Expert Commentator/Boundary Commentator) (2021/22–present)
 Ryan Daniels (Perth Boundary Commentator) (2020/21–present)
 Theo Doropoulos (Adelaide Boundary Commentator) (2021/22–present)
 Elyse Villani (Expert Commentator/Tasmania Boundary Commentator) (2019/20, 2021/22–present)
 Nazeem Hussain (Guest Commentator) (2021/22–present)
 Dirk Nannes (Expert Commentator) (2018/19, 2021/22–present)
 Justin Langer (Expert Commentator) (2022/23–present)
 Natalie Yoanidis 

Past

 Amelia Mulcahy (Adelaide Boundary Commentator) (2018/19–2019/20)
 Tom Cooper (Tasmania Boundary Commentator) (2018/19–2019/20)
 Ryan Daniels (Perth Boundary Commentator) (2018/19–2019/20)
 Brian Lara (Expert Commentator) (2020/21)
 Brendon McCullum (Expert Commentator) (2019/20)
 Tim Paine (Expert Commentator) (2019/20)
 Phil Tufnell (Expert Commentator) (2018/19)
 Sam McClure (Boundary Commentator) (2018/19–2019/20)
 Jim Wilson (Host/Boundary Commentator) (2018/19–2019/20)
 Michael Slater (Expert Commentator) (2018/19–2020/21)

Women's Big Bash League
Current

 Abbey Gelmi (Host) (2018/19–present)
 Erin Holland (Host) (2021/22–present)
 Andy Maher (Host/Ball-by-Ball Caller) (2018/19–2019/20, 2021/22–present)
 Jason Richardson (Host/Ball-by-Ball Caller) (2018/19–2019/20, 2021/22–present)
 Lisa Sthalekar (Expert Commentator) (2018/19–present)
 Brad Hodge (Expert Commentator) (2018/19–present)
 Alister Nicholson (Ball-by-Ball Caller) (2021/22–present)
 Kristen Beams (Expert Commentator) (2021/22–present)
 Emma Inglis (Expert Commentator) (2021/22–present)
 Callum Ferguson (Expert Commentator) (2021/22–present)
 Kirby Short (Expert Commentator) (2021/22–present)
 Emily Smith (Expert Commentator) (2021/22–present)
 Ryan Daniels (Boundary Commentator) (2021/22–present)

Past

 Amelia Mulcahy (Boundary Commentator) (2018/19–2019/20)
 Dirk Nannes (Expert Commentator) (2018/19)
 Mel Jones (Caller) (2020/21)
 Julia Price (Expert Commentator) (2018/19–2020/21)
 Katey Martin (Expert Commentator) (2020/21)
 Megan Barnard (Host) (2020/21)
 Michael Slater (Caller) (2020/21)
 Trent Copeland (Expert Commentator) (2019/20–2020/21)

Other Cricket presenters

 Jeff Thomson (2001)
 Tony Squires (2005)
 Stuart MacGill (2005) 
 Kerry O'Keeffe (2005)
 Kath Loughnan (Bushfire Bash Boundary Commentator) (2020)
 Mark Howard (Bushfire Bash Commentator) (2020)

Tennis

Final
Wimbledon

 Todd Woodbridge  (Host/Commentator)
 Rennae Stubbs  (Commentator)
 Sam Smith (Commentator)
 John Newcombe (Commentator)
 Geoff Masters (Commentator)
 Jim Courier (Expert comments)
 Darren Cahill (Expert comments)

Davis Cup

 Todd Woodbridge (Host/Commentator)
 Basil Zempilas (Host/Commentator, Perth events)
 John Fitzgerald (Commentator)
 Roger Rasheed (Commentator)

Past

 Garry Wilkinson (1976–2014) (Host/Commentator)
 Kylie Gillies (1996–2010) (Reporter/Presenter, Australian Open)
 Bruce McAvaney (1990–2016) (Commentator)
 Scherri-Lee Biggs (2013–2014) (Reporter)
 John Alexander (1987–2010) (Commentator)
 Sandy Roberts (1980–2013) (Host/MC/Commentator)
 Tracy Austin (2006–2010) (Commentator)
 Matthew White (2005–2012, 2014) (Host/Commentator)
 Tom Williams (2000s–2013) (Reporter)
 Luke Darcy (2014) (Host/Commentator, Brisbane International)
 Johanna Griggs (1990s–2012, 2014) (Host)
 Rebecca Maddern (2014–2015) (Reporter)
 Jo Griggs (2016) (Early Morning Host)
 Jim Wilson (2014–2016) (Afternoon Host)
 Dave Culbert (2016) (Afternoon Host)
 Jason Richardson (2016) (Late Evening Host)
 Kim Clijsters (2016) (Commentator)
 Giaan Rooney (2013, 2015) (Reporter)
 Alicia Molik (2011, 2015) (Commentator)

Horse Racing
Present

 Bruce McAvaney (Host, 2013–present) 
 Jason Richardson (Host, 2018–present)
 Emma Freedman (Host, 2021–present)
 Hamish McLachlan (Presenter/Reporter, 2013–present)
 Simon Marshall (Racing Analyst, 2013–present)
 Katelyn Mallyon (Racing Analyst, 2017–present)
 Michelle Payne (Racing Analyst, 2020–present)
 Deane Lester (Racing Analyst)
 Lee Freedman (Racing Analyst)
 Gerard Middleton (Racing Analyst)
 Henry Dwyer (Racing Analyst)
 Ben Way (Betting ring)
 John Letts (Interviews, 2013–present)
 Nigel Carmody (Trackside Reporter)
 Lizzie Jelfs (Trackside Reporter, 2020–present)
 Emily Bosson (Trackside Reporter)
 Emma Vosti (Reporter)
 Kate Waterhouse (Reporter)
 Stephanie Rice (Reporter, 2021–present)

Past

 Giaan Rooney (2013)
 Scherri-Lee Biggs (2012–2013)
 Sonia Kruger (2002–2011)
 Matthew White (2004–2012) 
 Glen Boss (2011)
 Sandy Roberts (2002–2013)
 Kylie Gillies (2002–2006)
 Rebecca Maddern (2013–2015)
 Ryan Phelan (2014–2020)
 Rachael Finch (Presenter/Reporter, 2011–2018)
 Hamish McLachlan (Presenter/Reporter, 2007–2018)
 Edwina Bartholomew (Presenter/Reporter, 2013–2018)
 John Letts (Interviews, 2002–2018)
 Johanna Griggs (Presenter/Reporter, 2002–2018)
 Pat Welsh (Presenter/Reporter, 2002–2018)
 Ryan Phelan (Presenter/Reporter, 2014–2018)
 Basil Zempilas (MC, 2014–2018)
 Hugh Bowman (Racing Analyst, 2020)

Motor Racing

V8 Supercars
Current

 Mark Beretta (Host/Commentator/Pit reporter, 2007–2014, 2021–present)
 Abbey Gelmi (Host, 2021–present)
 Neil Crompton (Host/Commentator/V8 Xtra Host, 2007–2014, 2021–present)
 Mark Skaife (Commentator, 2009–2014, 2021–Present)
 Mark Larkham (Pit reporter/Expert Analysis, 2008–2014, 2021–present)
 Molly Taylor (Pit reporter, 2021–present)
 Jack Perkins (Expert Commentator, 2021–present)
 Brad Hodge (Reporter, 2021–present)
 Craig Lowndes (Expert Commentator, 2021–present)
 Garth Tander (Expert Commentator, 2021–present)
 Charli Robinson (Reporter, 2021–present)

Past

 Greg Murphy (Pit reporter/Commentator, 2012–2014)
 Aaron Noonan (Support category commentator, 2007–2014)
 Chad Neylon (Support category commentator, 2013–2014)
 Matthew White (Host/Commentator, 2007–April 2014)
 Tom Williams (Reporter, 2007–2013)
 Daniel Gibson (Pit reporter, 2007–2008)
 Grant Denyer (Pit reporter, 2007–2011)

Bathurst 12 Hour

 Mark Beretta (Host/Pit reporter, 2015–present)
 Chris Stubbs (Host/Pit reporter, 2020–present)
 Richard Craill (Commentator, 2015–present)
 Graham Goodwin (Commentator, 2015–2017)
 Jonny Palmer (Commentator, 2018–present)
 John Hindhaugh (Commentator, 2015–present)
 Shea Adam (Pit reporter, 2015–present)
 Chad Neylon (Pit reporter, 2016–present)
 Alex Hart (Reporter, 2018–present)

TCR Australia

 Mark Beretta (Host, 2020–present)
 Abbey Gelmi (Host, 2020–present)
 Richard Craill (Commentator, 2020–present)
 Greg Rust (Commentator, 2020–present)
 Matt Naulty (Commentator, 2020–present)
 Chris Stubbs (Commentator, Pit reporter, 2020–present)
 Cameron van den Dungen (Commentator, 2020)
 Molly Taylor (Pit reporter, 2020–present)
 Jack Perkins (Pit reporter, 2020–present)
 Jess Dane (Pit reporter, 2020–present)

Rugby League

2017 Rugby League World Cup

 Jim Wilson (Host)
 Dan Ginnane (Caller)
 Andrew Moore (Caller)
 Mark Braybrook (Caller)
 Brett Kimmorley (Expert Analysis/Sideline Commentator)
 Laurie Daley (Expert Analysis)
 Gary Belcher (Expert Commentator)
 Andrew Ryan (Expert Commentator)
 Scott Sattler (Expert Commentator)
 Brent Tate (Sideline Commentator)
 Adrian Morley (Expert Commentator)
 Ryan Girdler (Sideline Commentator)
 Shane Webcke (Commentator) 
 Benji Marshall (Expert Analysis)
 Mark Geyer (Expert Analysis)
 Josh Massoud (Reporter)
 Liam Cox (Reporter)
 Pat Welsh (Reporter)
 Michelle Bishop (Reporter)
 Chris Garry (Reporter)
 Renee Gartner (Reporter/Commentator - Women's Matches)
 Allana Ferguson (Expert Analysis/Commentator - Women's Matches)
 David Tapp (Commentator - Women's Matches)
 Drury Forbes (Commentator - Women's Matches)
 Bill Harrigan (Commentator - Women's Matches)
 Nathan Cayless (Commentator - Women's Matches)

Golf
Current

 Pat Welsh (Host/Commentator, 2012–present)
 Wayne Grady (Commentator, 2012–present)
 Grant Dodd (Commentator, 2012–present)
 Ewan Porter (Commentator, 2017–present)
 Todd Woodbridge (On Course Commentator/Reporter, 2017–present)
 Alison Whitaker (On Course Commentator/Reporter, 2017–present)
 Bree Laughlin (Reporter, 2017–present)
 Jason Richardson (Host, 2018–present)

Past

 Sandy Roberts (Host/Commentator, 2012–2013)
 Peter Donegan (Host/Commentator, 2014–2016)
 Ian Baker-Finch (Commentator, 2012–2016)

Swimming

 Basil Zempilas (Host/Commentator, 1998–2019)
 Giaan Rooney (Commentator, 2018–2019)
 Ian Thorpe (Commentator, 2018–2019)
 Nathan Templeton (Poolside Commentator, 2018–2019)

Stawell Gift
Current

 Jason Richardson (Host)
 Dave Culbert (Commentator)
 Melinda Gainsford-Taylor (Expert Commentator)

Past

 Peter Donegan (Host/Commentator)

Rugby Union

Rugby World Series

 Mark Doran (Host/Commentator, 2018)
 Gordon Bray (Commentator, 2018)
 Ashley Morrison (Commentator, 2018)
 Michael Lynagh (Commentator, 2018)
 Tony Lewis (Commentator, 2018)
 Scott Fava (Commentator, 2018)
 Peter Rowsthorn (Commentator, 2018)
 Dani Orlando (Reporter, 2018)
 Sam Longley (Field Reporter, 2018)

Soccer

Manchester United vs Perth Glory/Leeds United

 Mark Readings (Host, 2019)
 Mel McLaughlin (Host, 2019)
 David Davutovic (Commentator, 2019)
 Stan Lazaridis (Commentator, 2019)
 David Basheer (Commentator, 2019)

Sydney FC v Tottenham 2015

 Jim Wilson (Host, 2015)
 Archie Thompson (Commentator, 2015)

A-League All Stars 2013/14, Liverpool v Victory 2013

 Jim Wilson (Host, 2013)
 Robbie Thomson (Commentator, 2013)
 Michael Bridges (Commentator, 2013)

Matilda's Olympic Qualifiers 2016

 Jason Richardson (Host, 2016)
 Melissa Barbieri (Analysis, 2016)
 Brenton Speed (Commentator, 2016)

Logo history

See also
ABC Sport
Nine's Wide World of Sports
Ten Sport
SBS Sport
Fox Sports (Australia)
List of Australian television series
List of longest running Australian television series
Sports broadcasting contracts in Australia

References

External links
 

 
1956 establishments in Australia
Sports divisions of TV channels